Bicellonycha wickershamorum is a species of firefly in the beetle family Lampyridae. It is found in North America.

Subspecies
These two subspecies belong to the species Bicellonycha wickershamorum:
 Bicellonycha wickershamorum piceum Cicero, 1982
 Bicellonycha wickershamorum wickershamorum Cicero, 1982

References

Further reading

 
 

Lampyridae
Bioluminescent insects
Articles created by Qbugbot
Beetles described in 1982